The following highways are numbered 224:

Canada
 Manitoba Provincial Road 224
 Nova Scotia Route 224
 Prince Edward Island Route 224
 Quebec Route 224
 Saskatchewan Highway 224

China
 China National Highway 224

Costa Rica
 National Route 224

Japan
 Japan National Route 224

United States
 U.S. Route 224
 Arkansas Highway 224
 California State Route 224 (former)
 Colorado State Highway 224
 Florida State Road 224
 Georgia State Route 224
 Iowa Highway 224
 K-224 (Kansas highway)
 Kentucky Route 224
 Maine State Route 224
 Maryland Route 224
 Minnesota State Highway 224 (former)
 Missouri Route 224
 Montana Secondary Highway 224
 Nevada State Route 224 (former)
 New Mexico State Road 224
 New York State Route 224
 Oregon Route 224
 Pennsylvania Route 224 (former)
 South Dakota Highway 224
 Tennessee State Route 224
 Texas State Highway 224
 Texas State Highway Spur 224
 Utah State Route 224
 Virginia State Route 224
 Washington State Route 224
 Wyoming Highway 224